Triphora is the generic name of two groups of organisms. It can refer to:

Triphora (gastropod), a genus of sea snails in the family Triphoridae
Triphora (plant), a genus of plants in the family Orchidaceae